Ambasamudram Ambani is a 2010 Indian Tamil-language comedy drama film written and directed by Ramnath. P. It was produced by actor Karunas, Singapore R. Saravana and A. John Peter. The film stars Karunas, Navneet Kaur, Ambani Shankar, and Kota Srinivasa Rao alongside an ensemble supporting cast including Cochin Haneefa, Sriranjini, Livingston, Delhi Ganesh, and R. Sundarrajan. Karunas had also composed the songs, while Sabesh–Murali composed the background score and lyrics written by "Kaviperarasu" Vairamuthu. Cinematography was handled by P. Pulidevan and editing by V. T. Vijayan. The film released on 7 February 2010 and become a decent hit.

Plot
Dhandapani, coming from a poor background, nurtures his ambition to become an owner of businesses like Reliance, Vasanth & Co, Saravana Stores, etc. He meets Nandhini, who falls in love with him because of his steadfast ambition. Dhandapani is not in a position to accept owing to his goals. Thereafter, he gives all his hard-earned money to Annachi to own a shop in his newly constructed complex. Before the construction is over, Annachi dies. Annachi's son Kishore does not believe that Dhandapani could have given money to his father and forcibly chases away Dhandapani, while he is also later betrayed by Karthi. Later, he learns that Dhandapani paid 35 lakhs for the shop from the registrar. Finally, Dhandapani succeeds in getting a new shop and setting up his supermarket.

Cast

 Karunas as Dhandapani (nickname Ambani)
 Navneet Kaur as Nandhini
 Kota Srinivasa Rao as Annachi 
 Cochin Haneefa as Nandhini's father
 Sriranjini as Nandhini's mother
 Shankar as Karthi, Dhandapani's assistant
 Cheran Raj as Kishore, Annachi's son
 Livingston as Johnson
 Delhi Ganesh as Dhandapani's first house owner
 Nirosha as Ranganayaki, and Dhandapani's second house owner
 Singamuthu as House Broker
 T. P. Gajendran as Police Inspector
 Chaams as Bank Cashier
 Mayilsamy as Cellphone Person
 Appukutty as Dhandapani's neighbourhood
 Nellai Siva as Head Constable
 Sindhya
 R. Sundarrajan
 Lollu Sabha Balaji
 Swaminathan
 Ragasya in a special appearance
 Grace Karunas in a special appearance
 Sridhar in a special appearance ("Poo Pookkum")

Soundtrack 
Soundtrack was composed by Karunas.
"Othakallu" - Samshudeen, Chinna Ponnu, Rahna Jack, Mcloga
"Poo Pookkum" - Iraj Weerarathna, Grace Karunas
"Soru Vechen" - Karthik
"Kola Kolaya" - Rita
"Dhanda Dhandapani" - Rahul Nambiar, Ken Karunas

Reception
Rediff notes that "Ambasamudram Ambani is worth a watch." Sify wrote "Karunas a middle level comedian?s earnest and sincere attempt to turn hero with Ambasamuthiram Ambani falters due to a weak script. The film definitely has a nice, feel-good message but writer-director Ramnath?s script lets him down". Behindwoods wrote "Although AA moves at a lackadaisical phase, it sure is a lesson for people striving to achieve excellence through hard work. AA is a good moral story apt for a family outing".

References

External links
 
 Photo gallery
KRM Music Recording

2010 films
Indian comedy-drama films
2010s Tamil-language films
2010 directorial debut films
2010 comedy-drama films